Orsa & Winston is a Michelin Guide-starred restaurant in Los Angeles, California.

Reviews

The Infatuation says, "Orsa & Winston was once one of the most coveted reservations in LA, a Downtown gem serving creative Japanese and Italian dishes no one had ever seen before. It was a place we were excited to bring friends to try everything from chicken katsu sandwiches to scallop chowder with pickled grapes to chilled soba noodles with pesto, uni, and abalone."

See also 

 List of Michelin starred restaurants in Los Angeles and Southern California

References

External links
 

Michelin Guide starred restaurants in California
Restaurants in Los Angeles